= Monte Alpi oil field =

Oil field

Monte Alpi
- Country: Italy
- Region: Southern Apennines
- Location: Southern Apennines
- Offshore/onshore: onshore
- Operator: Eni

Field history
- Discovery: 1981
- Start of production: 1996

Production
- Current production of oil: 95,000 barrels per day (~4.7×10^{6} t/a)
- Estimated oil in place: 400 million barrels (~5.5×10^{7} t)

The Monte Alpi oil field is an oil field located in the region of the Southern Apennines. It was discovered in 1981 and developed by Eni. It began production in 1996 and produces oil. The total proven reserves of the Monte Alpi oil field are around 400 million barrels (58.6 million tonnes), and production is centered on 95,000 barrels per day (15,100 m^{3}/d).

A composite geological cross-section (based on reflection seismic data) covering the oil exploration permits in the southern Apennines, specifically the Val d’Agri area, spanning the provinces of Potenza, Matera, and Cosenza. The focus of hydrocarbon exploration is on the carbonates of the Outer Apulian Platform (Jurassic–Cretaceous). The subsurface structure of this area, proceeding from SW to NE, follows a mountain range–forebasin–foreland pattern; the Mesozoic carbonates that constitute the target of the oil exploration are buried beneath a thick, allochthonous sequence of an highly tectonized mountain range and partially deformed forebasin units. Vertical scale in TWT (two-way time). Text in Italian.
